Central Chennai is the part of Chennai city between the Coovum River and the Adyar River. While mostly grouped under South Chennai, Central Chennai is a term which has gained currency in recent times due to the rapid expansion of the city southwards. Covering the eastern neighbourhoods of Royapettah, Chepauk, Teynampet, Alwarpet, Mylapore, Triplicane and Mandaveli and the western neighbourhoods of Nungambakkam, Kodambakkam, Vadapalani, Virugambakkam, Valasaravakkam, Mambalam, T. Nagar, Nandanam and Saidapet, Central Chennai is largely upper class-upper middle class. The eastern part is largely upper class with two of the costliest pieces of real estate - the Boat Club Road and Poes Garden being located here while the western part is mainly middle class. Kodambakkam is the location of the Tamil film industry or Kollywood.

Central Chennai is made of old and well-established residential areas and is mostly overlooked by IT companies due to scarcity of vacant land and high real estate prices. The Central Chennai zone, with its head office at Ambattur, was included Ayanavaram, Aminjikarai, Maduravoyal, guindy and Egmore taluks. Mambalam is commonly called as one of the oldest village near Chennai.
 

Geography of Chennai